Joshua Andrew Bernard Ruffels (born 23 October 1993) is an English professional footballer who plays as a left-back for EFL Championship club Huddersfield Town.

Early life
Ruffels was born in Oxford, Oxfordshire.

Career

Coventry City
Ruffels made his first-team debut for Coventry City as a substitute on 16 August 2011 in a 2–1 defeat to Crystal Palace in the Championship, coming on to replace injured Gary McSheffrey after 18 minutes. He was released by Coventry at the end of the 2012–13 season.

Oxford United
Oxford United signed Ruffels on a free transfer on 30 July 2013. He made his debut as a substitute in a 3–1 league win over Torquay United on 17 August 2013 and his first starting appearance in a 2–1 home defeat to Portsmouth in the Football League Trophy on 8 October 2013. He scored his first senior goal in a 1–1 League Two draw versus Bury on 4 February 2014. On 17 April 2014, Ruffels signed a new contract keeping him at the club for a further two years. Nine days later, he was voted 'Young Player of the Year' after he established himself in the first team in his first full season for the club. On 20 October 2017, Ruffles agreed a new contract keeping him at Oxford until the end of the 2019–20 season, with an additional one-year option available. Ruffels won the Supporters' Player of the Year Award for the 2018–19 season. Signed as a midfielder, he now plays at left back.

Huddersfield Town
Ruffels agreed to join EFL Championship club Huddersfield Town on 1 July 2021. After contracting COVID-19 just as the season was about to commence in August 2021, Ruffels had to miss a lot of the early part of the season, but he finally made his Terriers debut as a substitute in their 3–2 win over Blackburn Rovers on 28 September 2021, where he also became the 1,000th player to play for Huddersfield Town.

He scored his first goals for Huddersfield when he scored twice in a 2-1 win at Queens Park Rangers on 8 November 2022.

Career statistics

Honours
Oxford United
Football League/EFL Trophy runner-up: 2015–16, 2016–17

References

External links

Profile at the Oxford United F.C. website

1993 births
Living people
Footballers from Oxford
English footballers
Association football defenders
Coventry City F.C. players
Oxford United F.C. players
Huddersfield Town A.F.C. players
English Football League players